A by-election was held for the New South Wales Legislative Assembly electorate of Belmore on 13 May 1910. The by-election was triggered by the death of Edward William O'Sullivan. O'Sullivan was elected as a Former Progressive but joined the Labour Party in 1909.

Dates

Results

Edward O'Sullivan had won Belmore at the 1907 election as a Former Progressive; however, he joined the Labour Party in 1909 and died in April 1910.

See also
Electoral results for the district of Belmore
List of New South Wales state by-elections

Notes

References

New South Wales state by-elections
Belmore
1910s in New South Wales